Panasonic (Japanese パナソニック Panasonikku) is the principal brand name of the Japanese electronics manufacturer Panasonic Corporation. The company sells a wide range of products under the brand worldwide, including plasma and LCD televisions, DVD and Blu-ray Disc recorders and players, camcorders, telephones, vacuum cleaners, microwave ovens, shavers, projectors, digital cameras, batteries, laptop computers (under the sub-brand Toughbook), CD players and home stereo equipment, fax machines, scanners, printers, electronic white-boards, electronic components and semiconductors.

The brand uses the marketing slogan "A Better Life, A Better World".

History
The Panasonic brand was created by Matsushita in 1955 for the Americas region because the National brand, which was its principal brand in its home market of Japan, was already registered by others. The Panasonic brand was created from the elements "pan" - meaning "all" - and "sonic" - meaning "sound" - because it was first used for audio equipment. Panasonic also sold the first bread machine.

On January 10, 2008, Matsushita announced that it intended to change the company name to Panasonic Corporation. The proposal to change the company's name was approved at the firm's annual shareholder's meeting on June 26 and the name took effect from October 1, 2008. In parallel the "National" brand, which had been used by the company in Japan for non-audio/visual products (mostly home appliances), was phased out and replaced with the Panasonic brand by March 2010.

References

External links

Panasonic website

Consumer electronics brands
Male grooming brands
Personal care brands
Panasonic Corporation brands
Products introduced in 1955
Japanese brands